"It's a Beautiful Day" is a song by Canadian singer Michael Bublé, released as the first single from his sixth studio album, To Be Loved. The single was released on iTunes on February 25, 2013. It peaked at number ten on the UK Singles Chart and it was certified gold by the Federation of the Italian Music Industry. The song also charted to top five in Belgium, Finland, Indonesia and Japan.

Critical reception

Music blog POP! Goes the Charts described the song as "surprisingly cheerful", noting its full arrangement and descriptive lyrics, and concluding that it would be a "huge seller".

Music video
A music video to accompany the release of "It's a Beautiful Day" was first released onto YouTube on March 25, 2013 at a total length of three minutes and fifty-one seconds. It was filmed on Colonial Street, the same street that appeared as Wisteria Lane in the series Desperate Housewives. Actress Jaime Pressly plays Bublé's unfaithful girlfriend in the video.

Live performances
On March 23, 2013 he performed the song live on long-running German-language entertainment television show Wetten, dass..?. He also performed the song live on Ant & Dec's Saturday Night Takeaway on March 30, 2013, and during his performance, Ant & Dec, Simon Cowell and Lewis Hamilton left the ITV studios on a golf buggy, and ran into a pub, Bublé then walks across the studio to find cardboard cutouts of Ant & Dec, he then leaves the studio with his band singing and walks to the pub and has a go at the karaoke version of "Let's Get Ready to Rhumble". Bublé performed It's a Beautiful Day (Swing Version) on The X Factor (U.S. season 3) Week 5 Result Show on November 28.

Track listing
 German CD single
 "It's a Beautiful Day" - 3:25
 "Hollywood" - 3:35

 7" vinyl
 "It's a Beautiful Day" - 3:25
 "Hollywood" - 3:34

 It's A Beautiful Day EP

 "It's a Beautiful Day" - 3:25
 "You'll Never Find Another Love Like Mine" 
 "Home" 
 "Me and Mrs Jones" 
 "At This Moment"

 Digital download
 "It's a Beautiful Day" - 3:25

Charts and certifications

Weekly charts

Year-end charts

Certifications

Release history

References

External links
 

2013 singles
Michael Bublé songs
Songs written by Michael Bublé
143 Records singles
Reprise Records singles
Songs written by Alan Chang
2013 songs
Song recordings produced by Bob Rock
Songs written by Amy S. Foster